The 2008 Ukrainian Super Cup became the fifth edition of Ukrainian Super Cup, an annual football match contested by the winners of the previous season's Ukrainian Top League and Ukrainian Cup competitions.

The match was played at the Vorskla Stadium, Poltava, on 15 July 2008, and contested by league winner Shakhtar Donetsk and cup winner Dynamo Kyiv. Shakhtar won it 5–3 on penalties.

Match

Details

2008
2008–09 in Ukrainian football
FC Dynamo Kyiv matches
FC Shakhtar Donetsk matches
Sport in Poltava
Ukrainian Super Cup 2008